John Garbett (born c. 1953) is an American film producer from Utah.

Career 
He was the producer of The Other Side of Heaven (along with Gerald R. Molen) and also of The Legend of Johnny Lingo (2003), for which he also wrote the screenplay.  This was loosely based on the screenplay his mother-in-law, Claire Whitaker Peterson, wrote for the film Johnny Lingo. He was also involved in the early stages of the production of Shrek but then left to pursue other projects.

Personal life 
Garbett is a member of the Church of Jesus Christ of Latter-day Saints.  Since 2007 has been a media executive producer and creative director for the church.

Sources

Latter Day Saints from Utah
American film producers
Living people
Place of birth missing (living people)
1953 births